Wabanakwut "Wab" Kinew  (born December 31, 1981), is the Leader of the Manitoba New Democratic Party and Leader of the Opposition in the Legislative Assembly of Manitoba.

Before entering politics, he was a musician, broadcaster and university administrator, best known as a host of programming on CBC Radio and CBC Television.

Early life
Originally from the Onigaming First Nation in Northwestern Ontario, he is the son of Tobasonakwut Kinew, a former local and regional chief and a professor of Indigenous governance at the University of Winnipeg, and Kathi Avery Kinew, a policy analyst. Kinew moved to suburban Winnipeg with his parents in childhood and attended Collège Béliveau, a French immersion school, and vacationed in Onigaming in the summers. He graduated from the University of Winnipeg Collegiate which Kinew said in a 2014 interview was "a private high school, one of the best in Winnipeg." Kinew earned a Bachelor of Arts degree in economics from the University of Manitoba.

Career
Kinew began working in broadcasting after the Winnipeg Free Press published a letter to the editor which he had written about Team Canada hockey, and a local CBC Radio producer contacted him to express interest in creating and airing a documentary feature on the matter.

In 2010, Kinew was a finalist for the Future Leaders of Manitoba award and lost to Canadian filmmaker and director Adam Smoluk. Other notable finalists of the award include Olympic champion Jennifer Jones, radio personality David 'Ace' Burpee, friend of Bell Let's Talk Karuna (Andi) Sharma, artist Kal Barteski, and Canadian restaurateur and philanthropist Sachit Mehra.

Kinew has been a reporter and host for the CBC's radio and television operations,<ref name=freepress>"Aboriginal rapper, CBC host has plenty to say". Winnipeg Free Press, January 24, 2009.</ref> including the weekly arts magazine show The 204 in Winnipeg and the national documentary series 8th Fire in 2012. He is also a host of the documentary program Fault Lines on Al Jazeera America.

In 2014, he appeared as a panelist on CBC Radio's Canada Reads, defending Joseph Boyden's novel The Orenda. The novel won the competition.

Kinew was a guest host of Q for two weeks in December 2014, and moderated the 2015 edition of Canada Reads.

Music
After being a member of the hip-hop groups Slangblossom and the Dead Indians in the mid 2000s, Kinew released his debut individual CD as a rapper, Live by the Drum, in 2009. The CD won an Aboriginal Peoples Choice Music Award for Best Rap/Hip-Hop CD. His second CD, Mide-Sun, followed in 2010.

 Albums 

University administration
In 2011, the University of Winnipeg named Kinew its first director of Indigenous inclusion. In 2014, Kinew was appointed acting associate vice-president of Indigenous Affairs after Jennifer Rattray resigned the position. He is also an honorary witness for the Indian Residential Schools Truth and Reconciliation Commission.

On October 25, 2014, Kinew received an honorary doctorate degree from Cape Breton University.

Writing
Kinew has written two books, a personal memoir and a children's book, which were published by Penguin Canada.

The memoir, The Reason You Walk, chronicles the year 2012, during which Kinew strove to reconnect with the Indigenous man who raised him.  The reviewer for The Globe and Mail commented: "the undeniable significance of The Reason You Walk's message, and the fact that the book holds so much for both aboriginal and non-aboriginal readers, makes it a must-read. This is not just a memoir, it's a meditation on the purpose of living."  Kinew was honoured with the 2016 Kobo Emerging Writer Prize for non-fiction, for this book, which comes with a $10,000 cash award.

In 2018, Kinew's children's book Go Show the World: A Celebration of Indigenous Heroes about notable figures in First Nations history, including John Herrington, Sacagawea, Carey Price, and Crazy Horse. He was inspired to write the stories of such people by Barack Obama's Of Thee I Sing, and K’naan’s song Take a Minute''.

In 2021, Kinew wrote a YA fantasy novel "Walking in Two Worlds"  published by Penguin Teen; an Indigenous teen girl is caught between two worlds, both real and virtual.

Politics
He considered running for the leadership of the Assembly of First Nations in its 2014 leadership election, but decided not to mount a campaign as he was newly married in August and felt it was not the right time to be away from home for an extended period.

In 2016, he was announced as a Manitoba New Democratic Party candidate for Fort Rouge in the 2016 provincial election.  During the final days of the campaign, misogynistic and anti-gay tweets and other social media comments were discovered by media on Kinew's Twitter feed. This created a scandal with calls for the New Democratic Party to drop Kinew from the ballots. Kinew apologized for his past comments.

On April 19, 2016, Kinew defeated Manitoba Liberal leader Rana Bokhari in the riding of Fort Rouge. He was subsequently named the NDP's spokesperson for reconciliation and critic for education, advanced learning, and training as well as housing and community development.

Kinew ran for leadership of the Manitoba NDP in 2017 and was elected leader at the convention of September 16, defeating the only other candidate, former cabinet minister Steve Ashton, by a margin of three to one.

Kinew led the Manitoba NDP into the 2019 provincial election; the party gained 6 seats but the PCs were re-elected to a majority.

Personal life
Kinew recounts that he "experienced racially motivated assaults by adults" during his time growing up in suburban Winnipeg. In 2003, Kinew was convicted of impaired driving. Kinew has since quit drinking and in 2014 applied for a pardon from the Canadian government, which was granted by the Parole Board of Canada in 2016. The Parole Board ruling removed from the Canadian Police Information Centre database references to his convictions on assaulting a taxi driver, a Driving Under the Influence conviction for refusing a breathalyzer sample, and two breaches of court orders.

In the spring of 2003, Kinew was charged with two counts of domestic assault related to allegations that he threw his then-girlfriend across a room during an argument. The charges  were subsequently stayed. Kinew denies the allegations.

Kinew is married to Lisa, a family physician who practises medicine at an inner-city clinic, and has two sons from a previous relationship.

Electoral record

References

External links
 
 

1981 births
Living people
21st-century Canadian non-fiction writers
21st-century Canadian politicians
21st-century Canadian rappers
21st-century First Nations writers
21st-century memoirists
Al Jazeera people
Canadian children's writers
Canadian male rappers
Canadian memoirists
Canadian television hosts
Canadian television journalists
CBC Radio hosts
CBC Television people
First Nations journalists
First Nations musicians
First Nations politicians
Manitoba CCF/NDP leaders
Musicians from Winnipeg
New Democratic Party of Manitoba MLAs
People from Kenora
Politicians from Winnipeg
Saulteaux people
Academic staff of University of Winnipeg
Writers from Winnipeg
21st-century Canadian male musicians
Ojibwe people